Lighthouse Interactive Game Publishing B.V. was a video game publisher established in 2005 by industry veterans.  With its head office in Haarlem, The Netherlands and a satellite office in Montreal, Canada, the company grew quickly and went on to establish offices in Toronto, Canada, and London, England.

The company was best known for publishing iconic titles such as the Sword of the Stars series, the Ship Simulator series and  many other critically acclaimed titles. The company was also the publisher of German Publisher dtp, in Scandinavia, UK and North America. In 2008 the company was acquired by the Canadian publicly traded company SilverBirch, in a cash transaction on 31 July 2008. SilverBirch was unable to survive the credit crisis of 2008 and was eventually forced into bankruptcy. As a fully owned subsidiary, Lighthouse Interactive was also closed.

Games published

2006
 LocoMania
 War World
 Ship Simulator 2006
 Barrow Hill: Curse of the Ancient Circle
 Sword of the Stars
 Keepsake

2007
 Darkness Within: October 2007
 Delaware St. John: Volume 1+2: February 2007
 Delaware St. John: Volume 3: June 2007
 Ship Simulator 2006 Add-On: February 2007
 Warpath: February 2007
 Sword of the Stars: Born of Blood 2007
 Undercover: Operation Wintersun - September 2007
 Ship Simulator 2008
 Avencast: Rise of the Mage November 2007
 SunAge: November 2007
 WWII Battle Tanks: T-34 vs. Tiger: 16 November 2007

2008
 Ship Simulator 2008: New Horizons April 2008
 Overclocked: A History of Violence - April 2008
 Belief & Betrayal - June 2008 (Excluding The Benelux)
 The Lost Crown: A Ghost-Hunting Adventure - July 2008 (UK)
 Sword of the Stars: A Murder of Crows - October 2008
 Rhiannon: Curse of the Four Branches - October 2008

Ship Simulator: Extremes
It will be the first game in the series that was not published by Lighthouse Interactive, but by Paradox Inc.

References

Video game development companies
Video game publishers
Video game companies established in 2005
Video game companies disestablished in 2009
Defunct video game companies of the Netherlands